Doras is a genus of thorny catfishes native to tropical South America.

Species 
There are currently five recognized species in this genus (three species - D. eigenmanni, D. fimbriatus and D. punctatus have recently been moved to the new genus Ossancora):
 Doras carinatus (Linnaeus, 1766)
 Doras higuchii Sabaj Pérez & Birindelli, 2008
 Doras micropoeus (C. H. Eigenmann, 1912)
 Doras phlyzakion Sabaj Pérez & Birindelli, 2008
 Doras zuanoni Sabaj Pérez & Birindelli, 2008

Fossil species
†Doras dioneae Sabaj Pérez, Aguilera & Lundberg, 2007 (Miocene)

References
 

Doradidae
Fish of South America
Fish of the Amazon basin
Catfish genera
Taxa named by Bernard Germain de Lacépède
Freshwater fish genera